The Panasonic Lumix DMC-G1 was the first digital mirrorless interchangeable-lens camera (MILC) adhering to the Micro Four Thirds system design standard. The G1 camera is similar to the larger Four Thirds system format DSLR cameras, but replaces the complex optical path needed for the optical viewfinder with an electronic viewfinder EVF displaying a live view image directly from the sensor. Eliminating the mirror box and optical viewfinder allows for smaller and lighter camera bodies, while the less complex optical path also allows for smaller, lighter lens designs. 

The DMC-G1 (also known as simply the "G1") was displayed for the first time at photokina 2008; it was available for sale in the United States and Europe in November 2008.

Micro Four Thirds system 

The Micro Four Thirds system standard uses the same sized sensor (nominal 4000 pixels by 3000 pixels) as the original Four Thirds system. One advantage of the smaller MFT system sensor (when compared to market leaders Canon and Nikon APS-C and full frame sized) is the ability to engineer smaller and lighter lenses since the smaller sensor allows for a reduced image circle.

Features 
The G1 camera and its lenses are smaller than competing DSLRs. It uses a sophisticated projection system to achieve a clearer, smoother image in its electronic viewfinder than in compact camera EVFs. As it lacks a separate autofocus sensor, the G1 uses contrast-detect autofocus, utilizing the readout from the main sensor. The performance of this AF system is comparable to the phase-detect systems in conventional DSLRs.

The G1 was packaged with a 14–45 mm ƒ/3.5–5.6 kit lens (28–90 mm equivalent) and can use all native Micro Four Thirds System lenses regardless of manufacturer. Four Thirds System lenses can be used with an adapter, although response time, especially focus response, can be slower. Legacy lenses from nearly every major manual focus camera mount, such as Leica M, Leica R, Olympus OM, Nikon F, Canon FD, Minolta SR, M42 Screw Mount, Contax/Yashica Mount and others can also be mounted and used in manual mode. Canon EF mount lenses can be used with an adapter. The Micro Four Thirds system specification supports lenses with optical image stabilization.

In many ways, the G1 was considered a landmark camera, kicking off a new market for mirrorless interchangeable lens system cameras. The camera was available in three colors: black (suffix K), red (R) and blue (A). Upon introduction the United States, MSRP for body and kit lens was set at USD 800.00

Successor models 

The G1's successor model is the Panasonic Lumix DMC-G2 which was announced in March 2010. The third model in the "G" line, the Panasonic Lumix DMC-G3, was announced in May 2011.

References

External links
Panasonic DMC-G1 Press Release
Panasonic Lumix DMC-G1 Photos
Panasonic Lumix DMC-G1 Review – Digital Camera Resource Page
Panasonic Lumix DMC-G1 Review – Digital Photography Review
Panasonic Lumix DMC-G1 Review – Imaging Resource

G1
Japanese inventions